Taryn Linley Gollshewsky (born 18 May 1993) is an Australian athlete specialising in the discus throw. She represented her country at the 2017 World Championships without qualifying for the final. In addition, she won a bronze medal at the 2017 Summer Universiade.

Her personal best in the event is 60.27 metres set in Perth in 2016.

International competitions

References

1993 births
Living people
Australian female discus throwers
World Athletics Championships athletes for Australia
Athletes (track and field) at the 2014 Commonwealth Games
Athletes (track and field) at the 2018 Commonwealth Games
Commonwealth Games competitors for Australia
Sportspeople from Bundaberg
Universiade medalists in athletics (track and field)
Universiade bronze medalists for Australia
Australian Athletics Championships winners
Medalists at the 2017 Summer Universiade
21st-century Australian women